Afrogethes is a genus of pollen beetles in the family Nitidulidae. There are at least 2 described species in Afrogethes.

Species
 Afrogethes canadensis (Easton, 1955)
 Afrogethes saevus (LeConte, 1859)

References

 Audisio, P., A. R. Cline, A. De Biase, G. Antonini, E. Mancini, M. Trizzino, L. Costantini, et al. (2009). "Preliminary re-examination of genus-level taxonomy of the pollen beetle subfamily Meligethinae (Coleoptera: Nitidulidae)". Acta Entomologica Musei Nationalis Pragae, vol. 49, no. 2, 341–504.

Further reading

 Arnett, R.H. Jr., M. C. Thomas, P. E. Skelley and J. H. Frank. (eds.). (2002). American Beetles, Volume II: Polyphaga: Scarabaeoidea through Curculionoidea. CRC Press LLC, Boca Raton, FL.
 
 Richard E. White. (1983). Peterson Field Guides: Beetles. Houghton Mifflin Company.

External links

 NCBI Taxonomy Browser, Afrogethes

Nitidulidae